New Zoo Revue is an American half-hour children's television show that ran in first-run syndication from 1972 to 1977.

Concept
The 196-episode musical comedy-format show conveyed the concepts of cooperation and guidance for living in contemporary society. Each episode dealt with a topic such as moving away, courtesy, bragging, or patience.

Though hosted by humans Doug and Emmy Jo (married in real-life Doug Momary and Emily Peden), the show featured costumed full-bodied puppet characters, primarily Freddie the Frog, Henrietta Hippo, and Charlie the Owl.

The show received awards and recommendations from the National Education Association and the National School Board Association.

New Zoo Revue was acquired from O Atlas Entertainment and the show's original co-creator, Barbara Atlas; the property is now owned by Frank A. O'Donnell, who is based in Las Vegas. The library continues to be licensed and broadcast by various networks across the US. Episodes can be viewed, and merchandise and DVDs of the original episodes can be purchased on the Internet.

Characters
 Doug (played by Doug Momary) - a human who is friends with Freddie, Charlie, and Henrietta.
 Emmy Jo (played by Emily Peden) - Doug's helper.
 Freddie the Frog (performed by Yanco Inone, voiced by Joni Robbins) - a fun-loving frog who is a bit naïve. While the same size as the other adult-sized characters, Freddie is characterized (at least in some episodes) as a school-aged child.
 Charlie the Owl (performed by Sharon Baird, voiced by Bob Holt and later Bill Callaway) - a serious, know-it-all owl who lives in a tall tree equipped with an elevator. Working as a scientist and an inventor, Charlie is known to give out "One-Bell Prizes" on occasion (subtly making a pun on the Nobel Prize).
 Henrietta Hippo (performed by Larri Thomas, voiced by Hazel Shermet) - a tutu-wearing, genteel hippopotamus with a Southern Belle personality who is a bit shy.
 Mr. Dingle (played by Chuck Woolery) - a friendly elderly postman who is also a shopkeeper and a Jack-of-All-Trades.
 Mrs. Goodbody (played by Fran Ryan) - a nosy neighbor who occasionally visits. She served as an advice columnist for The All-New Zoo Gazette.

Guest stars
 Composer Henry Mancini made a cameo appearance.
 Actor Jim Backus of Mr. Magoo and Gilligan's Island fame makes a cameo.
 Jesse White, best known as the original Maytag repairman in TV commercials, guest starred on a few episodes.
 June Lockhart, best known for her roles on Lassie, Lost in Space and Petticoat Junction, guest starred in the episode "Shyness" as Penelope Potter a very shy woman.
 Richard Dawson, famous for acting in the series Hogan's Heroes and on the game shows Match Game and Family Feud, guest starred in the "Time Travel" episode as a knight from medieval England.
 Jo Anne Worley appeared as talk show host Vanessa Gramcracker.

See also
 Johnny and the Sprites
 Zoobilee Zoo
 Yo Gabba Gabba!

References

External links
 

First-run syndicated television programs in the United States
1970s American children's comedy television series
1970s American musical comedy television series
1972 American television series debuts
1977 American television series endings
English-language television shows
American children's musical television series
American television shows featuring puppetry
Television series about birds
Television series about frogs